Melanie Horeschowsky (1901–1983) was an Austrian stage, film and television actress.

Selected filmography
 The Prodigal Son (1934)
 Der Kaiser von Kalifornien (1936)
 Another World (1937)
 Clarissa (1941)
 What Does Brigitte Want? (1941)
 The Rainer Case (1942)
 Melody of a Great City (1943)
 Insolent and in Love (1948)
 Arlberg Express (1948)
 Bonus on Death (1950)
 A Heidelberg Romance (1951)
 Your Heart Is My Homeland (1953)
 Maxie (1954)
 Cabaret (1954)
 Engagement at Wolfgangsee (1956)
 Imperial and Royal Field Marshal (1956)
 So ein Millionär hat's schwer (1958)
 Panoptikum 59 (1959)
 What a Woman Dreams of in Springtime (1959)
 The Dance of Death (1967)
 Student of the Bedroom (1970)
 Liebe Melanie (1983, TV film)

References

Bibliography 
 Giesen, Rolf.  Nazi Propaganda Films: A History and Filmography. McFarland, 2003.

External links 
 

1901 births
1983 deaths
Actresses from Vienna
Austrian film actresses
Austrian stage actresses
Austrian television actresses